"That Thang" is a song written and recorded by song by American country music duo Fast Ryde. It was released in late July 2009 as the duo's debut single.

Critical reception
This song was met with mixed reviews. Juli Thanki of Engine 145 gave the single a thumbs-down rating, criticizing the song for its repeated use of sung syllables and its similarity in theme to Trace Adkins' "Honky Tonk Badonkadonk." Alison Bonaguro, who reviewed the song in the blog for television network CMT said that it was "a nice little catchy rocker." Bobby Peacock of Roughstock also compared it to "Honky Tonk Badonkadonk," but also called the song a "silly little piece of ear candy."

Chart performance
The song peaked at 38 on the U.S. Billboard Hot Country Songs charts for the week ending September 26, 2009.

References

Republic Nashville singles
Fast Ryde songs
2009 songs
2009 debut singles